Navarretia leptalea (formerly Gilia leptalea) is a species of flowering plant in the phlox family known by the common name Bridges' pincushionplant.

It is native to the Sierra Nevada and southern Cascade Range in California and Oregon, where it grows in colorful carpets in mountain meadows. It produces glandular stems with linear or narrowly oval-shaped leaves. The tiny stem is topped with an inflorescence of one or more funnel-shaped pink flowers with long, narrow throats.

External links
Jepson Manual Treatment
Photo gallery

leptalea
Flora of California
Flora of Oregon
Flora of the Sierra Nevada (United States)
Natural history of the California chaparral and woodlands
Flora without expected TNC conservation status